Auli may refer to:

People

Given name
 Auli Kiskola (born 1995), Finnish biathlete
 Auli Hakulinen (born 1941), Finnish professor
 Auli Mantila (born 1964), Finnish film director

Surname
 Jordi Condom Aulí, Spanish footballer
 Joan Auli (1796-1869), Spanish organist

Places
 Auli, India
 Auli, Norway, served by Auli Station

Other
Auļi, Latvian folk/world music band

See also
 Aulis (disambiguation)